Hélène Ricardo (born 23 May 1974) is a French former backstroke and freestyle swimmer who competed in the 1996 Summer Olympics.

References

1974 births
Living people
French female freestyle swimmers
French female backstroke swimmers
Olympic swimmers of France
Swimmers at the 1996 Summer Olympics
21st-century French women
20th-century French women